Golam Mohammad was a Major General of Bangladesh Army and former Director General of the Directorate General of Forces Intelligence. He is the former the Director General of Bangladesh Institute of International and Strategic Studies.

Early life and education 
Mohammad graduated from Mirzapur Cadet College. He completed his Masters on Defence Strategic Studies from the University of Madras. He studied at the National Defense University and completed a second Masters in National Security Strategy.

Career 
Mohammad was commissioned in the infantry crop of the East Bengal Regiment on 14 June 1979.

From 1989 to 1990, Mohammad served in Namibia as part of the United Nations Transition Assistance Group.

Mohammad was the Directing Staff of Defence Services Command and Staff College.

In 2007, Mohammad was promoted from Deputy Director General of the Directorate General of Forces Intelligence to Director General of the Directorate General of Forces Intelligence in June 2007 and promoted to Major General. During the 2006–2008 Bangladeshi political crisis, the Bangladesh Military ruled the country through the un-elected Fakhruddin Ahmed caretaker government which made the Directorate General of Forces Intelligence very influential. The United States Ambassador to Bangladesh, James F. Moriarty, warned Mohammad that his country was strongly opposed to the creation of the Directorate General of Forces Intelligence backed Islamic Democratic Party, made out of former members of the terrorist organization Harkat-ul-Jihad-al-Islami Bangladesh, on 12 November 2008. He also expressed surprise that Sheikh Hasina was pressured by Brigadier General A. T. M. Amin to lobby the United States to accept the Islamic Democratic Party. Brigadier General Emadul Haque, director general of Counter Terrorism and Intelligence Bureau, was also present in the meeting between Mohammad and the ambassador. Mohammad apologized to the ambassador and assured him that the Islamic Democratic Party will not be allowed to register. He was a close friend to H.T. Imam, advisor to former Prime Minister and Awami League chairperson, Sheikh Hasina. His friendship provided a link between the caretaker government and Awami League.

In 2009, Mohammad edited the book, National Security Bangladesh 2009, published by The University Press Limited. During the Caretaker government rule both Mohammad and Army Chief Moeen U Ahmed took stance on political issues publicly. They were able to increase the defence budget to 64 billion taka in 2008-2009 budget which was an increase of 10 billion taka and the biggest defence budget in the history of Bangladesh. In February 2009, Mohammad was transferred from Director General of the Directorate General of Forces Intelligence to General Officer Commanding of 33rd Infantry Division based in Comilla Cantonment. Major General Mollah Fazle Akbar replaced his as Director General of the Directorate General of Forces Intelligence.

References 

Living people
Bangladesh Army generals
Year of birth missing (living people)
Directors General of the Directorate General of Forces Intelligence
University of Madras alumni
National Defense University alumni
Mirzapur Cadet College alumni